137th Street may refer to:

 137th Street, a street in Manhattan, King's County, New York City, New York State, USA; see List of numbered streets in Manhattan
 137th Street (Metra), another name for Riverdale (Metra station) just south of the city of Chicago
 137th Street Yard, an underground rail yard on Manhattan, New York County, New York City, New York State, USA; see List of New York City Subway yards
 137th Street – City College (IRT Broadway – Seventh Avenue Line), a New York City subway station

See also
 List of highways numbered 137